The 2007 European Road Championships were held in Sofia, Bulgaria, on 19–22 July 2007. Regulated by the European Cycling Union, the event consisted of a road race and a time trial for men and women under-23 and juniors.

Schedule

Individual time trial 
Thursday 19 July 2007
 Women U23, 24 km
 Men juniors, 24 km

Friday 20 July 2007
 Women juniors, 34 km
 Men U23, 12 km

Road race
Saturday 21 July 2007
 Women U23, 112 km
 Men juniors, 140 km

Sunday 22 July 2007
 Women juniors, 70 km
 Men U23, 168 km

Events summary

Countries
  Netherlands at the 2007 European Road Championships
incomplete list

Medal table

References

External links
The European Cycling Union

 
European Road Championships, 2007
Road cycling
European Road Championships by year
International cycle races hosted by Bulgaria